Migeon may refer to:

People with the surname
Armand Viellard-Migeon (1842-1905), French politician.
Barbara Migeon (born 1931), American geneticist.
Claude Migeon (1923-2018), French-born American pediatric endocrinologist.
François Viellard-Migeon (1803-1886), French politician.
Jean-Baptiste Migeon (1768-1845), French businessman and politician.
Jules Migeon (1815-1868), French author and politician.

Place
Migeon Avenue Historic District, historic district in Connecticut, USA.